Ambrish Singh Pushkar is an Indian politician and a member of 17th Legislative Assembly of Mohanlalganj, Uttar Pradesh of India. He represents the Mohanlalganj constituency of Uttar Pradesh. He is a member of the Samajwadi Party.

Political career
Pushkar has been a member of the 17th Legislative Assembly of Uttar Pradesh. Since 2017, he has represented the Mohanlalganj constituency and is a member of the Samajwadi Party.

Posts held

See also
Uttar Pradesh Legislative Assembly

References

Uttar Pradesh MLAs 2017–2022
Samajwadi Party politicians
Living people
1974 births
Samajwadi Party politicians from Uttar Pradesh